The Irish language is a modern Goidelic language spoken in Ireland, also known as Irish Gaelic or Gaeilge. Irish language may also refer to:

Hiberno-English, the dialect of English written and spoken in Ireland
Languages of Ireland, an overview of languages spoken in Ireland, including Northern Ireland and the Republic of Ireland
Languages of Northern Ireland, an overview of languages spoken in Northern Ireland
Shelta, a mixed English/Irish cant spoken by Irish Travellers